Bhopal district of Madhya Pradesh, India. of Parbati River.

History 

In the 18th century, Parason was ruled by a Rajput Thakur (chief). He formed an alliance with other Rajput chiefs to counter the growing power of the neighbouring Rajput principality of Mangalgarh. The Mangalgarh was a small principality ruled by a dowager Rani (female ruler), and protected by the mercenary Dost Mohammad Khan. After a prolonged conflict, the two parties agreed to a truce during the Holi festival. However, Khan violated the truce and defeated the Parason Thakur's army, which was in a state of drunken revelry on Holi.

Demographics 

According to the 2011 census of India, Parason has 189 households. The effective literacy rate (i.e. the literacy rate of population excluding children aged 6 and below) is 59.01%.

References 

Villages in Berasia tehsil